Dominik Frieser (born 9 September 1993) is an Austrian professional footballer who plays as a midfielder for Hartberg.

Career
Frieser joined EFL Championship side Barnsley on 20 August 2020 after previously playing in Austria with Hartberg, Kapfenberger SV, Wolfsberger AC and LASK Linz. He scored his first goal for Barnsley in a 2-2 draw with Stoke City on 21 October 2020. In the same match he was adjudged by the referee's assistant to have been elbowed in the face by Stoke City player Nathan Collins and was shown lying on the ground clutching his face. Collins was shown a red card by the referee for violent conduct and dismissed from the field of play. After an appeal on 22nd October Collins' red card and subsequent 3 match ban was rescinded.

On 1 February 2022, Frieser signed a contract with Italian club Cesena until 30 June 2024.

On 30 August 2022, he returned to Hartberg on a three-year contract.

Career statistics

References

External links
 
 

1993 births
Living people
Association football midfielders
Austrian footballers
TSV Hartberg players
Kapfenberger SV players
Wolfsberger AC players
LASK players
Barnsley F.C. players
Cesena F.C. players
2. Liga (Austria) players
Austrian Football Bundesliga players
English Football League players
Serie C players
Austrian expatriate footballers
Expatriate footballers in England
Austrian expatriate sportspeople in England
Expatriate footballers in Italy
Austrian expatriate sportspeople in Italy